The Bengal cricket team represents the Indian state of West Bengal in domestic first-class cricket. It is considered Eastern India's strongest cricket team. The team plays its home matches at the historic Eden Gardens in Kolkata. Bengal has won two Ranji Trophy victories and has been runner-up a total of 13 times.

Bengal won the Vijay Hazare Trophy, also known as the Ranji One Day Trophy, in 2012. Under the captaincy of Sourav Ganguly, it beat Mumbai in the finals at the Feroz Shah Kotla Ground, Delhi on 12 March 2012.

Competition history
Bengal's first success came in the third Ranji Trophy season (1936/37), in which it came runners-up to Nawanagar. Two years later it beat Southern Punjab in the final of the Ranji Trophy to become the 4th team to hold the title. For the next 51 years, although it had been runner-up 11 times (including the year before), it did not regain the title until it beat a strong Delhi team in the 1990 final.

The team was runner-up twice consecutively in the 2005–06 and the 2006–07 season. Their ranks are occasionally bolstered by the return of Sourav Ganguly to the domestic competition.

Best performances in Ranji Trophy

Best performances in Vijay Hazare Trophy

Best performances in Syed Mushtaq Ali Trophy

Famous players

Players who represented India

Home ground
 Eden Gardens, Kolkata – The second largest stadium in the world and also the home ground of Kolkata Knight Riders
 Jadavpur University Campus Ground, Jadavpur- It has been leased out to the Cricket Association of Bengal and it often plays host to inter- and intra state cricket matches.
 Bengal Cricket Academy, Kalyani
 Deshbandu Park, North Kolkata – hosted matches of Vinoo Mankad Trophy, Cooch Behar Trophy, Vijay Merchant Trophy and Polly Umrigar Trophy

Current squad 
Players with international caps are listed in bold.

Updated as on 8 February 2023

See also
 Cricket Association of Bengal
 List of Cricket Association of Bengal Presidents

References

External links
 Ranji Trophy winners
 Bengal cricket team; records
 Saurav Ganguly made 135 runs vs Haryana in Ranji Trophy

Indian first-class cricket teams
Cricket in West Bengal
1889 establishments in India
Cricket clubs established in 1889